Taran son of Ainftech  was a King of the Picts from 693 until 697, according to the Pictish king-lists. His name is the same as that of the Gaulish thunder-god, Taranis.

His father is just a name, which occurs in various forms, e.g., Entifidich in the Poppleton manuscript, Enfidaig, Amfredech, Anfudeg, and as Amfodech in the French king-list embedded in the Scalacronica. The list in National Library of Scotland MS, Advocates' 34.7.3, seems to say that Taran was the brother of King Nechtan m. Der-Ilei, which could mean that Taran's mother was the Pictish princess Der-Ilei. However, the latter list is problematic and places the reign of King Bridei m. Der-Ilei, Nechtan's brother, after Nechtan; on the other hand, the list is one of those that is aware that Bridei was the son of Dargart, indicating access to material not available to some of the other lists.

Some of the king-lists say he reigned for fourteen years; however, the Poppleton and Lebor Bretnach lists, along with the Scalacronica list, give four years only, so the x may be a mistake. He was almost certainly succeeded by Bruide, the son of Dargart and Der-Ilei, although in what circumstances, it is hard to say.

Entries from the Irish annals, which Alan Orr Anderson suggested may be related to this Taran, are a report in the Annals of Ulster reporting "the killing of Ainfthech and Nia Néill and the sons of Boendo", where Ainfthech may be Taran's father, and then Taran's deposition in 696, and finally the report in the Annals of Ulster that "Tarachin went to Ireland" in 698.

Notes

References

7th-century births
697 deaths
Pictish monarchs
7th-century Scottish monarchs